James P. "Jim" Kavanaugh (born 1963) is an American businessman. He is known as the CEO and co-founder of World Wide Technology.

Early life 
Kavanaugh received his Bachelor of Science in business administration from Saint Louis University in 1986.

Sports 
Kavanaugh played soccer at Saint Louis University. In 1983, he was selected as Missouri amateur player of the year and competed for the United States in the 1983 Pan American Games.

In 1986, Kavanaugh was drafted to the Los Angeles Lazers, a Major Indoor Soccer League team, as the second overall pick. After a short stint in the league, Kavanaugh turned to business. Kavanaugh became the president of the board at St. Louis Scott Gallagher Soccer Club and Saint Louis FC board in 2012. He is a co-owner of the St. Louis Blues hockey team and St. Louis City SC.

Career

Kavanaugh worked as a sales manager for Future Electronics. In 1990, Kavanaugh and David Steward co-founded World Wide Technology (WWT), a company that provides technology products and services. He served as chief executive officer (CEO), while the company grew to billions of dollars in revenue. By 2015 it had become one of the largest companies in the St. Louis area. In 2021, WWT revenues were over $13 billion.

Awards
 2010: Saint Louis University Business Hall of Fame.
 2007: EY Entrepreneur of the Year
 1998: Forty under 40

References

Living people
Pan American Games competitors for the United States
Footballers at the 1983 Pan American Games
Soccer players from Missouri
American soccer players
Technology business executives
Businesspeople from St. Louis
Saint Louis University alumni
1963 births
Association footballers not categorized by position